The 1958 United States Senate election in New Jersey was held on November 4, 1958. 

Incumbent Senator H. Alexander Smith chose not to seek a third term in office. Democratic former U.S. Representative Harrison Williams won the open seat over U.S. Representative Robert Kean. This was one of a record twelve seats Democrats gained from the Republican Party in 1958.

Primary elections were held April 15. Kean defeated Eisenhower aide Bernard M. Shanley and Robert J. Morris, while Williams narrowly defeated Hoboken mayor John Grogan.

Republican primary

Candidates
 Robert Kean, U.S. Representative from Livingston and son of former Senator Hamilton Fish Kean
 Robert J. Morris, anti-communist activist and chief counsel to the Senate Subcomittee on Internal Security
 Bernard M. Shanley, aide to President Dwight Eisenhower

Withdrew
 H. Alexander Smith, incumbent Senator since 1944 (withdrew November 26, 1957) (endorsed Kean)

Declined
C. Douglas Dillon, U.S. Undersecretary of State for Economic Affairs
Wayne Dumont, State Senator from Warren County
Peter Frelinghuysen Jr., U.S. Representative from Morristown
Walter H. Jones, State Senator from Bergen County (declined March 1, 1958)

Robert Kean was the first candidate to announce that he would enter the race for Senate, notwithstanding Senator Smith's incumbency.

Incumbent Senator H. Alexander Smith initially announced in June 1957 that he would stand for re-election, expressing surprise that Kean had entered the race without informing him. Eisenhower aide Bernard Shanley joined the race on November 7, resigning from the Eisenhower administration to run immediately after Democratic Governor Robert Meyner won a landslide victory in the fall state election. Following Kean and Shanley's entries, Smith announced that he would confer with party leaders in an attempt to stave off a divisive primary contest between Kean and Shanley. Following such a conference, Smith announced in late November 1957 that he would not seek a third term in office.

Robert Morris joined the race on January 11. He announced a campaign focused on anti-communism and resistance to Soviet influence, saying, "The primary issue today is our survival as a free nation."

Kean formalized his campaign announcement on January 31, grounding his campaign on international peace, national defense "strong enough to deter any possible aggressor," and "a healthy, expanding national economy with a stable dollar."

State Senator Walter H. Jones, who was seen as a leading contender, announced he would not be a candidate on March 1.

Campaign
Kean campaigned on a liberal platform throughout the state, touring all twenty-one counties. He advocated an income tax cut and increased spending on public works and Social Security, but warned against "pump-priming" New Deal-era measures. Kean introduced a tax cut bill in the House. His sons, Robert Kean Jr. and future Governor Thomas Kean, campaigned on his behalf.

Morris presented himself as the only conservative candidate in the race and a "strong new voice." He attributed the ongoing economic recession and inflation to spending on foreign aid and defense, which he argued was made necessary by both Democratic and Republican vacillation in the face of Russian imperialism. To combat the recession, he proposed an immediate cut in income and excise taxes. He also argued for a "big tent" approach to politics and posited that the ongoing decline in the Republican vote in New Jersey was due to Eisenhower's feuds with conservative Senators Joseph McCarthy and Robert A. Taft.

In an appeal to commuters, Shanley proposed a constitutional amendment barring a state from taxing residents of another state.

Endorsements

Results

Both Shanley and Morris conceded the primary race on election night and endorsed Kean.

Democratic primary

Candidates
 John Grogan, Mayor of Hoboken
 Joseph E. McLean, former Princeton University professor and former State Commissioner of Conservation and Economic Development
 Harrison A. Williams, former U.S. Representative from Plainfield

Withdrew
 Thorn Lord, member of the Port of New York Authority and former U.S. Attorney

Declined
Archibald S. Alexander, former New Jersey Treasurer, Undersecretary of the U.S. Army, and nominee in 1948 and 1952 (endorsed Williams)
 James F. Murray Jr., Jersey City Commissioner and former State Senator (endorsed McLean)

In late February, Democrats culled their field of candidates to select an establishment candidate. Congressman Harrison Williams and Thorn Lord were the leading candidates for party support, though Lord had a slight majority of leadership support. On February 25, eight of the eleven candidates in the field announced they would withdraw if Lord were named. Only Hoboken mayor John Grogan and Meyner aide Joseph McLean announced they would force a primary regardless. Party leaders hoped to induce Grogan to withdraw by promising him a U.S. House seat, but talks between Governor Robert Meyner, Grogan, and Hudson County Senator William F. Kelly failed.

A poll of party leadership in Trenton showed that Lord had a slight majority of support, but party leaders empowered Governor Robert Meyner to choose between Lord and Williams. On March 4, Meyner announced that Williams would be the party-preferred candidate. He received the support of twenty of the twenty-one county party organizations; only Hudson County held out, maintaining support for Grogan.

Campaign
The campaign shaped up largely as a contest between the state party organization and the Hudson County machine. Meyner spoke on behalf of Williams in Edison, Livingston, Nutley, and Caldwell. Williams made a pair of campaign stops in Hudson County in the final week of the campaign. To combat the ongoing economic recession, Williams proposed an expansion in federal transportation programs and substantial increases in federal unemployment benefits.

Grogan campaigned in all twenty-one counties and presented himself as the most liberal and most anti-communist of the three options. To combat recession, he proposed a tax cut, increased unemployment benefits, public works spending, and higher pensions. He won a major late victory when the Camden County Democratic Organization endorsed his campaign, against the wishes of Governor Meyner and George E. Brunner. He was also able to flip the Atlantic County organization in the final week of the campaign. He had the full support of organized labor throughout the race.

Joseph McLean ran an outsider campaign without support from any establishment politicians, emphasizing his "unbossed" independence. He resisted pleas from Governor Meyner to abandon his campaign. He contended that the race was between himself and Grogan, claiming Williams's campaign "never got off the ground." He proposed a tax cut to end the recession and a robust program of national defense for the nuclear age.

As the campaign closed, it was regarded as a close contest and a test of the prestige of both Governor Meyner and the Hudson County organization, which typically accounted for 40 percent of the statewide primary vote. Meyner declined to make a prediction on election day and disclaimed the election as any test of his political strength.

Endorsements

Results

Williams was the first candidate to win a Democratic primary in New Jersey without carrying Hudson County in sixty years. He attributed his victory directly to Meyner's support.

General election

Candidates
 John M. D'Addetta, resident of Hoboken (People's Choice)
 Robert Kean, U.S. Representative from Livingston (Republican)
 Henry Krajewski, Secaucus resident and perennial candidate (Politicians are Jokers)
 Winifred O. Perry, Montclair resident and perennial candidate (Conservative)
 Albert Ronis, Bridgeton resident and perennial candidate (Socialist Labor)
 Daniel Roberts, resident of Newark (Socialist Workers)
 Harrison A. Williams, former U.S. Representative from Plainfield (Democratic)
 John Winberry, Democratic nominee for New Jersey's 8th congressional district in 1952 (Independent)

Campaign
Kean struggled with divisions in his own party. Party chair Samuel L. Bodine died on September 15, leaving a vacancy with no clear successor, creating an intra-party struggle for the seat between factions led by Clifford Case, Richard Stout, Walter H. Jones, Frank S. Farley, and Malcolm Forbes. At Kean's request, Senator Smith was named a temporary placeholder.

Results

See also 
 1958 United States Senate elections

References 

1958
New Jersey
United States Senate